Ashwin Chitale is an Indian actor. He won the national award for best child actor for his performance in the film Shwaas (2004) a Marathi language movie. Chitale belongs to Pune. He has played the role of Govinda in the Nagesh Kukunoor directed Hindi movie Aashayein. The other Hindi films in which he acted are Zor Lagaa Ke...Haiya! (2009) and Ahista Ahista (2006). He also played the role of Rishabh Shastri, son of Raghav Shastri(Nana Patekar) in Taxi No.9211.

He schooled at Pune's Nutan Marathi Vidyalaya.
Now studying philosophy masters from SP college, Pune

References

External links

Living people
Year of birth missing (living people)
Indian male child actors
Best Child Artist National Film Award winners